Mahir Habib Radhi (born 19 June 1977) is a former Iraqi football defender and is currently the assistant manager of Al-Shorta. He also played for Al-Shorta and scored the winning goal in the 2001 Iraqi Elite Cup final. He played for the Iraqi national team in the 2000 AFC Asian Cup.

During the 2002 World Cup qualifiers, coach Adnan Hamad who made several changes to the squad kept him in the final squad, but after being blamed for a goal against Saudi Arabia, he never played for Iraq again.

References

External links
 

Iraqi footballers
Iraq international footballers
2000 AFC Asian Cup players
Living people
1977 births
Place of birth missing (living people)
Al-Bahri players
Al-Mina'a SC players
People from Basra
Sportspeople from Basra
Al-Shorta SC players
Association football defenders